Volodarka Raion was a raion (district) in Kyiv Oblast of Ukraine. Its administrative center was the urban-type settlement of Volodarka. The raion was abolished on 18 July 2020 as part of the administrative reform of Ukraine, which reduced the number of raions of Kyiv Oblast to seven. The area of Volodarka Raion was merged into Bila Tserkva Raion.

At the time of disestablishment, the raion consisted of one hromada, Volodarka settlement hromada with the administration in Volodarka.

References

Former raions of Kyiv Oblast
1923 establishments in Ukraine
Ukrainian raions abolished during the 2020 administrative reform